, son of Michitsugu, was a kugyō or Japanese court noble of the Muromachi period (1336–1573). He held a regent position sessho in 1388. With a commoner he had a son Tadatsugu.

References

Fujiwara clan
Konoe family
1360 births
1388 deaths